The 2021 Summit League men's soccer tournament was the postseason men's soccer tournament for the Summit League held on November 11 and 13, 2021. The three-match tournament took place at MacKenzie Alumni Field in Macomb, Illinois. The four-team single-elimination tournament consisted of two rounds based on seeding from regular season conference play. The Denver Pioneers were the defending champions after no tournament was held in 2020.  Denver were champions in 2019.  Denver successfully defended their title, defeating Oral Roberts in the final in a penalty shoot-out.  The tournament win was Denver's seventh as a member of the conference, and the title was the fourth for head coach Jamie Franks.  Denver has now won seven of the past eight Summit League tournaments. As tournament champions, Denver earned the Summit League's automatic berth into the 2021 NCAA Division I men's soccer tournament.

Seeding 

Four of the seven Summit League men's soccer programs qualified for the 2021 Tournament. Teams were seeded based on their regular season records. Tiebreakers were used to determine the seedings of teams who finished with identical conference records.  The first tiebreaker was required to determine the first and second seed as Denver and Oral Roberts finished with identical 4–1–1 regular season records.  Denver was awarded the first seed based on their 1–0 victory over Oral Roberts on October 30.  A second tiebreaker was required to determine the third and fourth seeds as Omaha and Kansas City both finished with identical 4–2–0 regular season records.  Omaha earned the third seed based on their 2–0 victory over Kansas City on October 2.

Bracket

Source:

Schedule

Semifinals

Final

Statistics

Goalscorers

All-Tournament team

Source:

MVP in bold

References 

Summit League Men's Soccer Tournament
2021 Summit League men's soccer season